Patricia Lynne White  (born 7 September 1964) is a company director and former Australian politician, who represented Taylor in the South Australian House of Assembly for the Labor Party. She first won the seat at a state by-election held on 5 November 1994 following the retirement of former Premier Lynn Arnold and served for 16 years. She was a senior cabinet minister in the Rann government.

Career 
Born in Brisbane, White gained degrees in Engineering and Arts, from the University of Queensland, after which she worked as an engineering project manager in the transport and communications industries, then with the Defence Science and Technology Organisation.

Parliamentary career 
From 1995 to 2002, White held various Shadow Ministries including Education and Children's Services, Further Education and Training, Higher Education, Regional Development, Tourism, Racing, Sport, Youth, Multicultural and Ethnic Affairs.

When Labor took power in 2002, she became a minister. From 2002 to 2005, White has held Ministries including Education and Children's Services, Member of the Executive Council, Transport, Science and Information Economy, and Urban Development and Planning. She stepped down to spend more time with her young family.

She has been a member of several parliamentary committees, including Chair Economic and Finance, Industry Development, Public Works, Social Development, Select Committee into Building Surveyors / Private Certifiers, Select Committee into DETE funded schools.

The 2006 election saw White increase her margin to 27.4%.

White announced she would not re-contest her seat at the 2010 state election. Labor preselected former Labor assistant secretary Leesa Vlahos who retained the seat.

Post-Parliamentary career 
Post politics, White took up a senior executive role with ASX 50 global engineering services company, WorleyParsons. She has been a non-executive director of several corporations, including Australia Post.

In March 2017, White signed an open letter calling for the Government of South Australia to continue to investigate the "opportunity to develop an international used nuclear fuel management industry" identified by the Nuclear Fuel Cycle Royal Commission in 2015–16.

From 2018 she has been President and Board Chairman of Engineers Australia, the peak professional body for the engineering profession in Australia.

References

 

1964 births
Living people
Members of the South Australian House of Assembly
Australian Labor Party members of the Parliament of South Australia
University of Queensland alumni
University of South Australia alumni
21st-century Australian politicians
21st-century Australian women politicians
Women members of the South Australian House of Assembly
Members of the Order of Australia